Nicolás Furtado (born 6 February 1988) is an Uruguayan actor.

Life 
Furtado was born on 6 February 1988 La Teja, Montevideo. He took architecture courses before attending Ricardo Berio's Escuela del Actor from 2006 to 2008. Furtado started his acting career in Montevideo. In 2012, he moved to Argentina to act in the telenovela, Digo. Furtado won a Tato Award due to his versatility.

Filmography

Television
Porque te quiero así (2011)
Dulce amor (2012)
Terra ribelle 2 (2012)
Somos familia (2014)
El marginal (2016-2022)
Educando a Nina (2016)
Amongst Men (2021)

Film
Porno para principiantes, directed by Carlos Ameglio

Awards
2016: Tato Award for Best Supporting Actor

References

External links

1988 births
Male actors from Montevideo
21st-century Uruguayan male actors
Uruguayan emigrants to Argentina
Living people
Uruguayan male telenovela actors
Uruguayan male film actors